Stroman is the last name of:
 Greg Stroman, American football player
 Larry Stroman, American comic book artist and writer
 Marcus Stroman, American baseball pitcher for the New York Mets
 Susan Stroman, American theatre director, choreographer, film director, and performer

See also